Cryptocephalus spurcus is a species of case-bearing leaf beetle in the family Chrysomelidae. It is found in North America.

Subspecies
These two subspecies belong to the species Cryptocephalus spurcus:
 Cryptocephalus spurcus spurcus J. L. LeConte, 1858
 Cryptocephalus spurcus vandykei B. White, 1937

References

Further reading

 
 
 

spurcus
Articles created by Qbugbot
Beetles described in 1858